KCZE (95.1 "The Bull") is a Country formatted broadcast radio station licensed to New Hampton, Iowa, serving New Hampton and Chickasaw County, Iowa. The Bull is owned and operated by North Iowa Broadcasting, LLC.

History
KCZE was launched on October 9, 1989, as "Chickasaw Country". KCZE became The Bull in the mid-2000s and is the county's only radio station.

Transmission location
The KCZE transmitter is located on Mission Avenue, just south of New Hampton.

Programming
The station broadcasts a Country format, playing a mixture of new country, and classic country music.

KCZE broadcasts a variety of news content, including national news from the CNN Radio Network, state news from Radio Iowa, and local news, including agricultural and business news, as well as local weather and sports, plus funeral announcements, health information, and a community calendar. KCHA also broadcasts local religious services and religious programming on Sunday mornings.

Syndicated programming is also heard on The Bull, with the station airing The Road, Rick Jackson's Country Hall of Fame, Thunder Road and others.

Shows include the Morning Show with Your Chubby Little Bob and The Sports Zone with Jason Rude.  Other programming includes New Hampton sports and the University of Iowa athletics broadcasts.

Broadcast signal
The KCZE signal stretches from Nora Springs to Waukon, and from Cresco south to Waterloo, Iowa.

References

External links
 The Bull Online
 
 
 

CZE
Country radio stations in the United States
Radio stations established in 1989
1989 establishments in Iowa